Jacques Culot (born 5 August 1933) is a Belgian footballer. He played in two matches for the Belgium national football team in 1957.

References

External links
 
 

1933 births
Living people
Belgian footballers
Belgium international footballers
Sportspeople from Charleroi
Association football defenders
R. Charleroi S.C. players
R.S.C. Anderlecht players
S.C. Eendracht Aalst players